This is the complete list of World Aquatics Championships medalists in synchronised swimming from 1973 to 2022.

Medalists

Bold numbers in brackets denotes record number of victories in corresponding disciplines.

Solo routine

Medals:

Solo Free Routine

Medals:

Solo Technical Routine

Medals:

Duet routine
			

Medals:

Duet Free Routine

Medals:

Duet Technical Routine

Medals:

Team routine

Medals:

Team Free Routine

Medals:

Team Technical Routine

Medals:

Free Routine Combination

Medals:

Highlight Routine

Medals:

Mixed

Duet Free Routine

Medals:

Duet Technical Routine

Medals:

All-time medal table 1973–2022
Updated after the 2022 World Aquatics Championships.

Multiple medalists

Boldface denotes active synchronised swimmers and highest medal count per type. The medals won as reserve were not included into these tables.

Ranked by their gold medals

Ranked by their total medals

 
Synchronised swimming, World Aquatics Championships
Synchronised swimming